Oberhaid is a community in the Upper Franconian district of Bamberg.

Geography

Location
The community lies roughly seven kilometres northwest of Bamberg. The highest elevations are the Spitzelberg in the west at 325 m, and the Semberg in the east at 393 m. The location in the Main Valley in the Haßberge Nature Park area is ideal for hikers and cyclists. The outlying centre of Unterhaid is the Bamberg district’s lowest place at 230 m above sea level.

Neighbouring communities
Oberhaid borders on the municipal areas of Lauter, Bischberg and Viereth-Trunstadt, on the unincorporated area of Semberg and on the municipal areas of Baunach, Hallstadt and Bamberg. Oberhaid also borders on the community of Stettfeld and the town of Eltmann, which are both in the Haßberge district in Lower Franconia.

Constituent communities
Oberhaid’s main and namesake centre is by far the biggest of its Gemeindeteile with a population of 3,432. The community furthermore has these outlying centres, each given here with its own population figure: Staffelbach with 843 inhabitants, Unterhaid with 421, Johannishof with 20 and Sandhof with 2.

History
The Fulda Monastery already had property in the municipal area as early as the 8th century. The monastery at Michelsberg then expanded its landholdings in Oberhaid in the 13th century. The place therefore belonged to the High Monastery at Bamberg, and with the Reichsdeputationshauptschluss of 1803, the community passed to Bavaria.

Volunteer fire brigades
Freiwillige Feuerwehr Oberhaid
Freiwillige Feuerwehr Unterhaid
Freiwillige Feuerwehr Staffelbach

Religion
Community’s denominational breakdown:
  Roman Catholic:  3,919
  Evangelical Lutheran: 426
  other:  370

Amalgamations
In 1978, the formerly autonomous communities of Unterhaid and Staffelbach were amalgamated with Oberhaid.

Population development
Within municipal limits, 3,771 inhabitants were counted in 1970, 4,090 in 1987 and 4,775 in 2000. In January 2006 it was 4,718.

Politics

Community council

The community council is made up of 17 members, listed here by party or voter community affiliation, and also with the number of seats that each holds:
SPD 7 seats
CSU 7 seats
UBV/FW 2 seats
ÜL/CWG 1 seat
(as of municipal election in 2008)

Mayor
The mayor is Carsten Joneitis (SPD).

Coat of arms
Oberhaid’s arms might heraldically be described thus: Gules a wing sinister palewise argent emerging dexter therefrom an arm clad argent, the hand holding a Latin cross Or palewise, below dexter an inescutcheon, argent a cross sable.

Town partnership
There is a partnership with the community of Oberhain in Thuringia.

Economy and infrastructure

Transport
 There is an Autobahn interchange on the A 70, Viereth-Trunstadt exit, towards Oberhaid.
The Oberhaid railway station lies on the Bamberg–Schweinfurt line.
Local public transportation is by bus connection on the Bamberg–Schweinfurt route with stops in Oberhaid, Unterhaid and Staffelbach.

References

External links
 Community’s website

Bamberg (district)